Võros (Võro: võrokõsõq, pronounced ,) are inhabitants of historical Võromaa (Vana Võromaa), a region in Southeastern Estonia (Võru and Põlva Counties with parts extending into Valga and Tartu Counties). The term is particularly used by proponents of a regional identity.

About 70,000 people live in historical Võromaa and many more identify as Võros although they live outside the territory, mostly in Tartu and Tallinn.

See also 
 Võru County (Võrumaa, Võromaa)
 Võro language
 Võro Institute
 Võro language newspaper Uma Leht

External links
Information about Võros in Eurominority

References

Ehala, Martin & Niglas, Katrin (2007): Empirical evaluation of a mathematical model of ethnolinguistic vitality: the case of Võro. Journal of Multilingual and Multicultural Development.
Eichenbaum, K.; Pajusalu, K. (2001): Setode ja võrokeste keelehoiakutest ja identiteedist. - Keel ja Kirjandus nr 7, lk. 483-489.
Eller, K. (1999): Võro-Seto language. Võro Instituut'. Võro.
Valk, A. (2000). Võrokeste identiteedist. K. Koreinik, J. Rahman (toim.) A kiilt rahvas kynõlõs.. Võrokeste keelest, kommetest, identiteedist (lk. 39-56). Võro Instituut, Võro.

Võro
Ethnic groups in Estonia
Baltic Finns